Waterton Lake is a mountain lake in southern Alberta, Canada and northern Montana, United States. The lake is composed of two bodies of water, connected by a shallow channel known locally as the Bosporus. The two parts are referred to as Middle Waterton Lake, and Upper Waterton Lake, the latter of which is divided by the Canada–United States border with Canada containing about two thirds of the lake while the Southern third falls in the United States. The Boundary Commission Trail ends at the lake as the last border marker was placed there on 8 August 1874. Lower Waterton Lake is north of Middle Waterton Lake and is separated by a channel known as the Dardanelles.

The northern, lower end of the main lake lies in Waterton Lakes National Park while the upper, southern part of the lake is located in Glacier National Park. In 1979, UNESCO established the Waterton Biosphere Reserve to protect the diverse habitats including prairie grasslands, aspen parkland, subalpine forests, alpine tundra and freshwater fens that surround the lake.

Waterton-Glacier International Peace Park was created by the US and Canada in 1932, and in 1976 it was designated an International Biosphere Reserve.  Later, in 1995, it was inscribed as a World Heritage Site by UNESCO.

More recent soundings have revealed a depth of 490 ft (150 m).

Highway 5 has its westernmost point on the shores of the lake.

Waterton River
The Waterton River is part of the South Saskatchewan River Basin, and the Oldman River Sub-Basin.

Waterton River flows north from the Lower Waterton Lake for approx. 32 km to reach the Waterton Reservoir (Est. 1964) by the village of Hill Spring.

The Waterton Reservoir diverts water of about 20 m3/s to the Belly River just upstream from the Belly's own diversion weir which diverts water to the St. Mary River. The Waterton continues north from the reservoir for approx. 39 km until it reaches the confluence with the Belly River, which is a tributary of the Oldman River.

Waterton River has relatively reduced sediment concentrations due to the lakes and the reservoir acting as a sediment-settling trap.

Waterton River's mean peak discharge averages about 80 m3/s.

Tributaries to the Waterton River include:
Foothill Creek
Drywood Creek
Yarrow Creek
Dungarvan Creek
Galwey Brook
Cottonwood Creek
Crooked Creek

Waterton Reservoir has a Full Supply Level (FSL) of 1,185.67 metres, and an Irrigation Capacity of 114,334 dam3.

References

Lakes of Glacier County, Montana
Lakes of Glacier National Park (U.S.)
Lakes of Alberta
Waterton Lakes National Park
Canada–United States border
International lakes of North America